Winogradskyella arenosi is a Gram-negative and aerobic bacterium from the genus of Winogradskyella which has been isolated from sediments from the Sea of Japan.

References

Flavobacteria
Bacteria described in 2009